Tavabe-e Kojur Rural District is a rural district (dehestan) in Kojur District, Nowshahr County, Mazandaran Province, Iran. At the 2006 census, its population was 4,851, in 1,347 families. The rural district has 23 villages.

References 

Rural Districts of Mazandaran Province
Nowshahr County